This is a list of singles that charted in the top ten of the ARIA Charts in 2011.

Top-ten singles

Key

2010 peaks

2012 peaks

Entries by artist
The following table shows artists who achieved two or more top 10 entries in 2011, including songs that reached their peak in 2010 and 2012. The figures include both main artists and featured artists. The total number of weeks an artist spent in the top ten in 2011 is also shown.

See also
2011 in music
ARIA Charts
List of number-one singles of 2011 (Australia)
List of top 25 singles for 2011 in Australia

References 

Australia Top 10
2011 in Australia
Top 10 singles 2011
Australia 2011